Death of the Black-Haired Girl is the eighth published novel by author Robert Stone (1937-2015). The hardcover version was published on November 12, 2013. The e-book edition was released a week before, on November 5, 2013. It was also the final novel that Stone published during his lifetime.

References

Works by Robert Stone (novelist)
Campus novels
Houghton Mifflin books
2013 American novels